Daria Kozlova may refer to:
Daria Kozlova (curler), a curler who participated in the European Mixed Curling Championship
A passenger on Bashkirian Airlines Flight 2937